Costa Rica competed at the 2011 World Aquatics Championships in Shanghai, China between July 16 and 31, 2011.

Open water swimming

Men

Swimming

Costa Rica qualified 3 swimmers.

Men

Women

Synchronised swimming

Costa Rica has qualified 3 athletes in synchronised swimming.

Women

Reserve
Carolina Bolanos

References

Nations at the 2011 World Aquatics Championships
2011
World Aquatics Championships